Pseudocorinna is a genus of African corinnid sac spiders first described by Eugène Simon in 1910.

Species
 it contains twenty-nine species:
Pseudocorinna alligator Jocqué & Bosselaers, 2011 – Guinea, Liberia, Ivory Coast
Pseudocorinna amicorum Jocqué & Bosselaers, 2011 – Cameroon
Pseudocorinna amphibia Jocqué & Bosselaers, 2011 – Ivory Coast
Pseudocorinna banco Jocqué & Bosselaers, 2011 – Guinea, Ivory Coast
Pseudocorinna bilobata Jocqué & Bosselaers, 2011 – Togo
Pseudocorinna brianeno Jocqué & Bosselaers, 2011 – Guinea, Liberia, Ivory Coast
Pseudocorinna celisi Jocqué & Bosselaers, 2011 – Congo
Pseudocorinna christae Jocqué & Bosselaers, 2011 – Ivory Coast
Pseudocorinna cymarum Jocqué & Bosselaers, 2011 – Ghana
Pseudocorinna doutreleponti Jocqué & Bosselaers, 2011 – Cameroon
Pseudocorinna eruca Jocqué & Bosselaers, 2011 – Congo
Pseudocorinna evertsi Jocqué & Bosselaers, 2011 – Ivory Coast
Pseudocorinna febe Jocqué & Bosselaers, 2011 – Cameroon
Pseudocorinna felix Jocqué & Bosselaers, 2011 – Ivory Coast
Pseudocorinna gevaertsi Jocqué & Bosselaers, 2011 – Congo
Pseudocorinna incisa Jocqué & Bosselaers, 2011 – Gabon
Pseudocorinna juakalyi Jocqué & Bosselaers, 2011 – Congo
Pseudocorinna lanius Jocqué & Bosselaers, 2011 – Liberia, Ivory Coast
Pseudocorinna lobelia Jocqué & Bosselaers, 2011 – Congo
Pseudocorinna natalis Jocqué & Bosselaers, 2011 – Congo
Pseudocorinna naufraga Jocqué & Bosselaers, 2011 – Congo
Pseudocorinna okupe Jocqué & Bosselaers, 2011 – Cameroon
Pseudocorinna orientalis Jocqué & Bosselaers, 2011 – Congo
Pseudocorinna perplexa Jocqué & Bosselaers, 2011 – Nigeria
Pseudocorinna personata Jocqué & Bosselaers, 2011 – Cameroon
Pseudocorinna rutila Simon, 1910 (type) – Guinea-Bissau
Pseudocorinna septemaculeata Simon, 1910 – Cameroon, Equatorial Guinea (Bioko)
Pseudocorinna ubicki Jocqué & Bosselaers, 2011 – Equatorial Guinea (Bioko)
Pseudocorinna victoria Jocqué & Bosselaers, 2011 – Cameroon

References

Araneomorphae genera
Corinnidae
Spiders of Africa
Taxa named by Eugène Simon